Pride is a compilation album by the American musical group Living Colour, released in 1995. In addition to some of their most commercially successful songs, the album includes four rare tracks recorded for the follow-up to their third album, Stain. 

The collection is out of print; problems with the rights ownership make a reissue unlikely.

Critical reception
Entertainment Weekly wrote that "singles like 'Type' and 'Glamour Boys', and Vernon Reid’s dive-bomber guitar, amount to one mighty legacy." The Commercial Appeal opined: "Much of the Pride collection is just depressing, documenting the death of a promising band. So, unless you're a devoted fan, skip this one and use the bucks to replace your scarred copy of Vivid."

Track listing

Tracks 2–4 and 6 are previously unreleased.
Tracks 8, 9, 11, 12, and 17 are from Vivid.
Tracks 1, 13, 15, and 16 are from Time's Up.
Tracks 10 and 14 are from Stain.
Track 7 is from Biscuits EP.
Track 5 was released as a single.

Australian limited edition
Tracks 1, 5, 6 and 7 previously unreleased.
Track 2 is from Biscuits EP.
Track 3 is from Stain.
Track 4 is from True Lies Soundtrack.

Charts

References

1995 greatest hits albums
Living Colour albums
Epic Records compilation albums